Oscheius tipulae is a species of nematodes, described in association of the leatherjacket, the larva of Tipula paludosa.

O. tipulae is a satellite developmental genetic model organism used to study vulva formation. It is an androdioecious species characterized by the coexistence of males and hermaphrodites.

References

External links 

Rhabditidae
Nematodes described in 1971
Animal models